Charon Robin Ganellin FRS (25 January 1934 – ) is a British medicinal chemist, and Emeritus Smith Kline and French Professor of Medicinal Chemistry, at University College London.

He has contributed much to the field of drug discovery and development.  His most outstanding achievement was the discovery of cimetidine, a drug used to combat stomach ulcers, when he was working at Smith Kline and French. He has received many awards and much recognition for his scientific pursuits over the years.  He now lives near London and is a professor at University College London.

Early life

Born in East London on 1934 January 25, Charon Robin Ganellin knew from an early age that his calling was chemistry. During his studies at Harrow County School for Boys, he developed a strong aptitude for science and maths, but his performance in language and history was lacking. Although he enjoyed biology and natural history above his other subjects, he was influenced to pursue a career in chemistry. Because his father and his maternal uncle were chemists, he recognised that chemists could make a living. Uncertain if a career in biology was possible, he decided to become a chemist. He began his formal studies at Queen Mary College in London where he received his first degree, a bachelor of science in chemistry.  He continued his studies at Queen Mary College, researching tropylium chemistry with Michael J.S. Dewar where he discovered how to isolate the tropylium cation from cyclooctatetraene. For this research, he was awarded his PhD in organic chemistry in 1958 at the age of twenty-four.

Scientific Work

In 1958, shortly after his PhD studies at Queen Mary College, Ganellin joined Smith Kline and French Laboratories in the UK where he began research in medicinal chemistry. Two years after starting at SK&F, he went to the Massachusetts Institute of Technology where he performed his postdoctoral work with Arthur C. Cope.  At MIT he devised the first direct optical resolution of a chiral olefin using platinum complex chemistry. After a year at MIT, he returned to the United Kingdom to resume his work at SK&F.  In 1966 he headed a landmark research team at SK&F, collaborating with Sir James Black researching histamine H2-receptor antagonists.  This research eventually led to the discovery of cimetidine, also known by its trademark name Tagamet which is currently produced by GlaxoSmith Kline.

Cimetidine was a revolutionary drug at the time of its creation.  Peptic ulcers, or stomach ulcers, used to be a very serious medical condition.  Stomach ulcers were very difficult to treat and caused a great deal of pain.  If left untreated, they could even be life-threatening.  In some cases, surgery was required to remove the ulcer.   Because of these factors, cimetidine was an incredibly popular drug after it was approved for prescription.  Cimetidine first entered the market in the United Kingdom in 1976, and was received extremely well.  Cimetidine quickly garnered over one billion dollars in annual sales, making it the first blockbuster drug, and it is currently listed by the World Health Organization as one of the most essential drugs.

Ganellin's contribution to this research was integral to its success.  His adeptness at physical organic chemistry enabled him to understand the individual H2-receptor antagonist drugs they developed.  Initially, the team developed burimamide as a potential H2-receptor antagonist for medicinal use.  However, it was soon realised that burimamide was not an appropriate oral medicine.  They quickly identified a similar drug, metiamide, which appeared to have clinical potential.  However, metiamide also had a shortcoming – its safety was uncertain.  The end result of their trials was cimetidine, an H2-receptor antagonist superior to both burimamide and metiamide.   The precursor drugs which marked the progress of their research are termed prototypes.  These prototype drugs helped them understand the mechanisms that described how the drugs function.  Ganellin's input was vital to the progression of their research along the sequence of prototypes to final product.

Although Ganellin's contribution to the discovery of cimetidine was immeasurable, he was not alone.  He collaborated with many other scientists at SmithKline and French, including fellow medicinal chemist Graham J. Durant.  Durant was able to provide his expertise on guanidine chemistry to further the progress of the research.  Sir James Whyte Black, a biologist from Scotland, was also instrumental in their research.  He identified the role of the H2-receptor in the production of stomach acid.  This discovery was crucial to their research, providing the impetus to search for a suitable H2-receptor antagonist to affect production of stomach acid.  John C. Emmett, another medicinal chemist, is also credited as a co-discoverer of cimetidine.  In addition to these key players, many others contributed to the research, such as William Duncan, the director of research at SK&F, as well as Michael Parsons, whose pharmacological experience was greatly beneficial.

Later life
Ganellin's collaborators influenced him and imparted in him knowledge and experience which has remained with him throughout the decades.  Ganellin once said that the one achievement that gave him the "most professional pride" was his discovery of cimetidine.  This period of his life has defined his scientific career, while also providing him with inspiration to continue his research in medicinal chemistry.  Although Ganellin considers cimetidine his greatest achievement, he has never wavered in his devotion to scientific research.  In 1981 he set up the syllabus for the Summer School in Medicinal Chemistry for the Royal Society of Chemistry that was still running in 2014. It was also copied by the American Chemical Society. After his work on cimetidine was complete, he was given the position of vice-president for research at SK&F's Welwyn facility.  After his considerable tenure at SmithKline & French came to an end in 1986, Ganellin has continued to remain active in the affairs of medicinal chemistry.  Shortly before leaving, he was awarded his D.Sc. from London University for his research and publications on histaminergic drugs and elected as a Fellow of the Royal Society (the UK's National Academy of Science). In 1986, he was appointed as the SmithKline & French Chair of Medicinal Chemistry at University College London where he began a lengthy career in academia. His research group tackled at least 10 different medicinal chemical projects and one of these came to fruition. He is co-inventor of pitolisant, the first histamine H3-receptor antagonist/inverse agonist Wakix, for treating narcolepsy.

Awards and achievements
Since graduating, Robin Ganellin has authored or co-authored over 260 scientific papers and is listed as inventor or co-inventor on over 160 US patents.  He has served as the president of the IUPAC medicinal chemistry section, and for 10 years (until 2012) he was the chair of the subcommittee on medicinal chemistry and drug development.  He has won many awards and commendations over the years, both for his work on cimetidine and his research in other areas of medicinal chemistry. He has received awards in medicinal chemistry from many organisations, such as the Royal Society of Chemistry, the American Chemical Society, the Society of Chemical Industry, the Society for Drug Research, the European Federation for Medicinal Chemistry, the Société Chimie Thérapeutique of France, and the Medicinal Chemistry Division of the Italian Chemical Society.  He was also inducted into the US National Inventors Hall of Fame in 1990 for his work on cimetidine.  Ganellin currently serves as the Emeritus Professor of Medicinal Chemistry, although he is now partially retired.

References

External links
 "Charon Robin Ganellin", EHRS
 Tagamet: Discovery of Histamine H2-receptor Antagonists from American Chemical Society National Historic Chemical Landmarks
 National Inventors Hall of Fame
 https://web.archive.org/web/20080908075932/http://www.soci.org/SCI/awards/2007/html/hn339.jsp
 https://web.archive.org/web/20100721024621/http://wiz2.pharm.wayne.edu/ganellin.html

1934 births
Alumni of Queen Mary University of London
Living people
English chemists
Academics of University College London
Fellows of the Royal Society
People educated at Harrow High School